João Lucas de Almeida Carvalho (born 9 March 1998), known as João Lucas, is a Brazilian footballer who currently plays as a right back for Santos.

Club career

Early career
Born in Belo Horizonte, Minas Gerais, João Lucas had failed trials at Atlético Mineiro and Cruzeiro before joining Villa Nova's youth setup in 2015. In 2016, he moved to Goiás, initially joining the under-17 team.

Ahead of the 2019 season, João Lucas signed for Bangu. He made his senior debut on 22 February of that year, starting in a 2–0 Campeonato Carioca home loss against Fluminense.

Flamengo
On 9 May 2019, Flamengo signed João Lucas from Bangu for an undisclosed fee. Initially a backup to Rafinha, he made his club – and Série A – debut on 12 June, replacing Rodinei late into a 2–0 away win over CSA.

João Lucas scored his first goal for Flamengo on 25 January 2020, netting the equalizer in a 3–2 home win over Volta Redonda. However, he lost space after the arrival of Mauricio Isla and the proeminence of Matheuzinho.

Cuiabá

On 4 May 2021, João Lucas was loaned to top tier newcomers Cuiabá until the end of the year. An undisputed starter, he signed a permanent four-year deal with the club on 31 December.

Santos
On 9 December 2022, Santos announced the signing of João Lucas on a three-year contract. He made his debut for the club the following 14 January, starting in a 2–1 Campeonato Paulista home win over Mirassol.

Career statistics

Club

Notes

Honours
Flamengo
Copa Libertadores: 2019
Recopa Sudamericana: 2020
Campeonato Brasileiro Série A: 2019, 2020
Supercopa do Brasil: 2020, 2021
Campeonato Carioca: 2020

Cuiabá
Campeonato Mato-Grossense: 2022

References

External links

1998 births
Living people
Footballers from Belo Horizonte
Brazilian footballers
Association football defenders
Campeonato Brasileiro Série A players
Bangu Atlético Clube players
CR Flamengo footballers
Cuiabá Esporte Clube players
Santos FC players